Followers is a 2000 film. It was produced by Castle Hill Productions. The plot focuses on three college students who attempt to join a fraternity but soon find the fraternity president to be extremely racist.

References

External links

2000 films
American independent films
Films about race and ethnicity
2000 independent films
2000s English-language films
2000s American films